The Chinese Ambassador to Fiji is the official representative of the People's Republic of China to the  Republic of Fiji.

List of representatives

See also
China–Fiji relations

References 

 
Fiji
China